Reynolds may refer to:

Places

Australia
Hundred of Reynolds, a cadastral unit in South Australia
Hundred of Reynolds (Northern Territory), a cadastral unit in the Northern Territory of Australia

United States
 Reynolds, Mendocino County, California, a former settlement
 Reynolds, Georgia, a town in Taylor County
 Reynolds, Illinois, a village in Mercer and Rock Island counties
 Reynolds, Indiana, a town in White County
 Reynolds, Dallas County, Missouri, an unincorporated community
 Reynolds, Reynolds County, Missouri, an unincorporated community
 Reynolds, Nebraska, a village in Jefferson County
 Reynolds, North Dakota, a city
 Reynolds Township, Lee County, Illinois, a town
 Reynolds Township, Michigan, a civil township of Montcalm County
 Reynolds Township, Minnesota, a town in Todd County
 Reynolds County, Missouri, a county in southeast Missouri

Outer space
 Reynolds (crater), impact crater on Mars

Business
 Reynolds Brothers, a New Jersey clothing store chain
Reynolds Consumer Products
Reynolds Group Holdings
 Reynolds International Pen Company, a pen brand of Newell Rubbermaid
 Reynolds Technology
Reynolds 531 (bicycles)
 R.J. Reynolds Tobacco Company
 Reynolds Metals, a foods packaging company, acquired then sold by Alcoa, now a standalone company
Reynolds (cycling team) named after Reynolds International, a Reynolds Metals subsidiary
 The Reynolds and Reynolds Company

Fluid dynamics
Reynolds-averaged Navier–Stokes equations
Reynolds decomposition
Reynolds number
Reynolds transport theorem

Law
 Reynolds v. Sims, a 1964 U.S. Supreme Court case concerning State legislature electoral districts
 Reynolds v. United States, an 1878 U.S. Supreme Court case about polygamy and the use of religious duty as a defense to criminal prosecution
 United States v. Reynolds, a 1952 U.S. Supreme Court case concerning the State Secrets Privilege
 Reynolds v Times Newspapers Ltd, a UK legal case concerning qualified privilege for publication of defamatory statements in the public interest, which led to the 'Reynolds defence'

People
 Reynolds (surname)
 Reynolds Price (1933–2011), American author

Other uses
Hubble–Reynolds law of galaxy surface brightness
Reynolds syndrome, a rare autoimmune disease
Reynold's News

See also
 Justice Reynolds (disambiguation)
 Reynolds High School (disambiguation)
 Rennell (disambiguation)
 Reynald (disambiguation)